Three referendums were held in Switzerland during 1947. The first was held on 18 May on a popular initiative for "economic reform and rights concerning work", and was rejected by voters. The second and third were both held on 6 July on revising the articles of the federal constitution covering the economy and a federal law on aged and bereavement insurance. Both were approved by voters.

Background
The May referendum, which was a popular initiative, and the July referendum on amending the constitution, which was a mandatory referendum, both required a double majority; a majority of the popular vote and majority of the cantons. The decision of each canton was based on the vote in that canton. Full cantons counted as one vote, whilst half cantons counted as half. The July referendum on the federal law on aged and bereavement insurance was an optional referendum, which required only a simple majority of votes in favour.

Results

May: Popular initiative on economic reform and work rights

July: Constitutional amendment

July: Aged and bereavement insurance

References

1947 referendums
1947 in Switzerland
Referendums in Switzerland